Chickasaw Plaza is a plaza along the Bricktown Canal in Bricktown, Oklahoma City, in the U.S. state of Oklahoma. The plaza features a statue of a Chickasaw warrior, which was sponsored by the Chickasaw Nation, as well as markers describing the tribe's history and land loss following the Indian Removal Act and Trail of Tears.

See also

 List of public art in Oklahoma City

References

External links
 

Bricktown, Oklahoma City
Chickasaw